The 1990 Chevrolet Classic, also known as the Guarujá Open, was a men's tennis tournament held in Guarujá in Brazil and played on hardcourt. It was part of the World Series of the 1990 ATP Tour. It was the fifth edition of the tournament and took place from 5 February through 12 February 1990. Second-seeded Martín Jaite won the singles title.

Finals

Singles

 Martín Jaite defeated  Luiz Mattar 3–6, 6–4, 6–3
 It was Jaite's 1st singles title of the year and the 10th of his career.

Doubles

 Javier Frana /  Gustavo Luza defeated  Luiz Mattar /  Cássio Motta 7–6, 7–6
 It was Frana's only title of the year and the 2nd of his career. It was Luza's 1st title of the year and the 2nd of his career.

References

Chevrolet
1990 Chevrolet Classic
Guarujá Open